Ulrich K. Laemmli is a Professor in the biochemistry and molecular biology departments at University of Geneva. He is known for the refinement of SDS-PAGE, a widely used method for separating proteins based on their electrophoretic mobility. His paper describing the method is among the most cited scholarly journal articles of all time. His current research involves studying the structural organization of nuclei and chromatin within the cell.

Major scientific contributions
Although electrophoresis was used to separate proteins before Laemmli's work, he made significant improvements to the method. The term "Laemmli buffer" is often used to describe an SDS-containing buffer that is used to prepare (denature) samples for SDS-PAGE.

Awards and honors
 Louis-Jeantet Prize for Medicine – 1996
 Elected fellow of the American Association for the Advancement of Science – 2006

References

External links
 Ulrich K. Laemmli's publication list
 Laemmli et al publications on Pubmed

Living people
Swiss biochemists
Academic staff of the University of Geneva
Fellows of the American Association for the Advancement of Science
Year of birth missing (living people)